Kenneth S. "The Rat" Linseman (born August 11, 1958) is a Canadian former professional ice hockey centre who played 15 seasons in the National Hockey League for the Philadelphia Flyers, Edmonton Oilers, Boston Bruins and Toronto Maple Leafs. He also played one season in the World Hockey Association for the Birmingham Bulls. He featured in four Stanley Cup Finals, notably winning the 1984 Stanley Cup with the Oilers.

Playing career
Linseman spent his entire junior career with the Kingston Canadians of the Ontario Major Junior Hockey League from 1974–77. He played in 187 games, scoring 286 points (133 goals-153 assists). He also added 33 points (16G-17A) in 25 playoff games. 

Prior to the 1977 WHA draft, Linseman and his agent Art Kaminsky sued the WHA in United States District Court for a league rule preventing teenage players from playing in the league, which the court ruled violated anti-trust laws. Linseman was drafted by the WHA's Birmingham Bulls in the 1977 WHA Amateur Draft, and spent the 1977–78 with the Bulls, getting 76 points (38G-38A) in 71 games, and adding 4 points (2G-2A) in five playoff games. He was then drafted by the Flyers as their first-round, 7th overall pick in the 1978 NHL Amateur Draft.

Linseman began the 1978–79 season with the Maine Mariners of the American Hockey League, getting 39 points (17G-22A) in 38 games before getting called up by the Flyers. He finished the season in Philadelphia, earning 25 points (5G-20A) in 30 games, then added 8 points (2G-6A) in 8 post-season games. Linseman spent the entire 1979–80 season with the Flyers, getting 79 points (22G-57A) in 80 games, then added 22 points (4G-18A) in 17 playoff games. An injury limited Linseman to 51 games in 1980–81, getting 47 points (17G-30A), and had 20 points (4G-16A) in 12 playoff games. 1981–82 was the best season of Linseman's career, as he scored a career high 92 points (24G-68A) in 79 games, and had 275 PIM, which was 7th highest in the NHL. In 4 playoff games, Linseman registered 3 points (1G-2A). On August 19, 1982, the Flyers traded Linseman, along with Greg Adams and Philadelphia's first and third round picks in 1983 to the Hartford Whalers in exchange for Mark Howe and Hartford's third-round pick in 1983. The Whalers then swapped Linseman to the Edmonton Oilers with Don Nachbaur for Risto Siltanen and Brent Loney.

Linseman picked up the nickname "The Rat" both by his appearance and the way he played. He had a great talent for agitating the opposing team to a high level of frustration, leading them to take penalties. He was once charged for kicking a player in the head with his skates.

With the Oilers in 1982–83, Linseman had 75 points (33G-42A) in 72 games, and helped the Oilers to the Stanley Cup finals with 14 points (6G-8A) in 16 post-season games. In 1983–84, Linseman had 67 points (18G-49A) in 75 games, and helped the Oilers win the Stanley Cup with 14 points (10G-4A) in 19 games. He scored an NHL record 3 series clinching goals, since tied by Martin Gélinas of the Calgary Flames in 2004. After winning the Stanley Cup, Linseman found himself on the move as the Oilers dealt him to the Boston Bruins for Mike Krushelnyski on June 21, 1984.

Linseman had a solid 1984–85 season, with 74 points (25G-49A) in 74 games, and added 10 points (4G-6A) in five playoff games. Injuries held Linseman to 64 games in 1985–86, but he scored 81 points (23G-58A), and in 3 playoff games, had 1 assist. His production fell in 1986–87, as he was held again to 64 games, getting 49 points (15G-34A), and in 4 playoff games, had 2 points (1G-1A). In 1987–88, Linseman was healthy again, and saw his point total increase, getting 74 points (29G-45A) in 77 games, and helped the Bruins to the Stanley Cup Finals, earning 25 points (11G-14A) in 23 playoff games. Linseman had a productive 1988–89 season, as he got 72 points (27G-45A) in 78 games, however a late season injury prevented him from playing in any playoff games. In 1989–90, Linseman began the season with Boston, playing in 32 games and getting 22 points (6G-16A). He was traded to the Flyers on January 16, 1990 in exchange for Dave Poulin. Linseman then played 29 games with the Flyers, getting 14 points (5G-9A) as the team failed to make the playoffs.

On August 31, 1990, Linseman signed as a free agent with the Oilers and spent the 1990–91 season with the team, getting 36 points (7G-29A) in 56 games, and had an assist in two playoff games. On October 7, 1991, the Oilers traded Linseman to the Maple Leafs for cash; however Linseman spent only two games with Toronto, getting no points. He was released by the Leafs, and ended up playing 5 games in an Italian Hockey League with HC Asiago, getting 6 points (3G-3A) in 5 games, and then 7 points (3G-4A) in 6 playoff games. After the 1991–92 season, Linseman hung his skates up and retired.

Awards and achievements
 Stanley Cup champion – 1984
 OMJHL Second Team All-Star – 1977

Career statistics

Regular season and playoffs

International

References

External links
 

1958 births
Living people
Asiago Hockey 1935 players
Birmingham Bulls draft picks
Birmingham Bulls players
Boston Bruins players
Canadian ice hockey centres
Edmonton Oilers players
Ice hockey people from Ontario
Kingston Canadians players
Maine Mariners players
National Hockey League first-round draft picks
Philadelphia Flyers draft picks
Philadelphia Flyers players
Sportspeople from Kingston, Ontario
Stanley Cup champions
Toronto Maple Leafs players
Canadian expatriate ice hockey players in Italy